Ronald David Hesketh,  (born 16 June 1947) is a British Anglican priest and retired military chaplain. From 2001 to 2006, he served as Chaplain-in-Chief, and thereby head of the Royal Air Force Chaplains Branch, and Archdeacon for the Royal Air Force.

Early life and education
Hesketh was born on 16 June 1947. He was educated at King David High School, a Jewish Orthodox state school in Liverpool that also accepts students of other faiths. He studied at Bede College, Durham, graduating with a Bachelor of Arts (BA) degree in 1968. In 1969, he matriculated into Ridley Hall, Cambridge, an Evangelical Anglican theological college, to train for ordained ministry; He also studied at St. Michael's College, Llandaff, the Welsh Anglican theological college, from which he graduated with a Diploma in Pastoral Studies (DPS) in 1971. He later studied with the Open University, from which he completed a Diploma in Reformation Studies in 1977.

Ecclesiastical career
Ron Hesketh was ordained in the Church of England as a deacon in 1971 and as a priest in 1972. His first post was a curacy at Holy Trinity Church, Southport in the Diocese of Liverpool. He was then Chaplain to the Mersey branch of the Mission to Seamen. He was a chaplain of the Royal Air Force (RAF) from 1975 to 2006, serving as Chaplain-in-Chief and Archdeacon for the RAF from 2001 to 2006. He was a Canon and Prebendary at Lincoln Cathedral from 2001 to 2006; an Honorary Chaplain to the Queen from 2001 to 2006; and Vocational Officer for the Diocese of Worcester from 2006 to 2011. He has been Co-ordinating Chaplain to the West Mercia Police Force since 2009. In 2018, Ron Hesketh was appointed as the National Chaplain to the Order of St John Fellowship.

Personal life
In 1971, Ron Hesketh married Vera Ruth Taylor. Together they have two children: one son and one daughter.

References

1947 births
Living people
Church of England priests
20th-century English Anglican priests
21st-century English Anglican priests
Royal Air Force Chaplains-in-Chief
People educated at King David High School, Liverpool
Alumni of the College of the Venerable Bede, Durham
Alumni of the Open University
Alumni of Ridley Hall, Cambridge
Alumni of St Michael's College, Llandaff
Honorary Chaplains to the Queen
Fellows of the Royal Geographical Society
Companions of the Order of the Bath